Rovdane or Rovde is a village in Vanylven Municipality in Møre og Romsdal county, Norway. The district around Rovdane is referred to as Rovdestranda. Rovde Church is located in Rovdane.

History
Beginning in 1838, Rovdane was administratively a part of the municipality of Herøy (see formannskapsdistrikt law).  However, this changed on 1 January 1867 when Herøy was divided into two and the western part became Sande Municipality, which included the areas on both sides of the Rovdefjorden.  In 1905, the new municipality of Rovde was separated from Sande, with Rovdane as the administrative centre of Rovde Municipality.  On 1 January 1964, the district of Rovdestranda (south of the fjord), where Rovdane is located, was transferred to Vanylven Municipality whereas the rest of Rovde was reunited with Sande Municipality. Rovdestranda had 436 inhabitants at that time.

References

Vanylven
Villages in Møre og Romsdal